This is a list of rulers of the Duchy of Brittany. In different epochs the sovereigns of Brittany were kings, princes, and dukes. The Breton ruler was sometimes elected, sometimes attained the position by conquest or intrigue, or by hereditary right. Hereditary dukes were sometimes a female ruler, carrying the title duchesse of Brittany. Its principal cities and regions were ruled by counts who often found themselves in conflict with the Breton ruler, or who became the Breton ruler. 

During the declining years of the Roman Empire, the earliest Breton rulers in Gaul were styled "kings" of the small realms of Cornouaille and Domnonia. Some such kings may have had a form of hegemony over all of the Brythonic populations in the Armorican peninsula, and Riothamus is called King of the Britons by the chronicler Jordanes. However, there are no certain rulers of the whole of Brittany, which was divided into the fiefdoms of local counts. 

The Duchy of Brittany had its origins in the Battle of Trans-la-Forêt of 939, which established the river Couesnon as the boundary between Brittany and Normandy. In 942, Alan II paid homage to Louis IV of France; however, the duchy did not gain royal attention until 1123, when Louis VI of France confirmed the bishop of Nantes. No other Duke of Brittany repeated Alan II's homage until Arthur I recognised Philip II of France as his liege in 1202.

The area was often called a Duchy, and its rulers were considered independent Sovereign Dukes. However, one historical view is that before the middle of the 12th century the Dukes of Brittany were often also called Counts by the Kings of France, as the kingdom of France then saw Brittany as no more than a county. In 1297, the peninsula was elevated into a Duchy in the peerage of France. This view is not consistent with the manner in which Charles VIII of France and then Louis XII of France approached the Duchy and the rights of Anne of Brittany who married each in succession.

Early Breton rulers
Conan Meriadoc (4th century) – by tradition, the founder of Brittany
Budic II (early 6th century)
Waroch II (late 6th century)
Saint Judicaël (early 7th century)
Alain II Hir (640?–690)
Morman ( 814–818)
Wihomarc ( 822–825)

Dukes of Brittany

Dukes under the Carolingians
Nominoe (or Nevenoe) ( 841–851), as a missus dominicus of the Emperor Louis the Pious, a count of Vannes (Gwened) and arguably a duke (dux) of Brittany
Erispoe ( 851–857), as a duke, then as a king
Salomon (or Salaun) ( 857–874), as a duke, then a king
Pasquitan (or Paskweten) ( 874–877), ruling Brittany (southern part) with Gurvand
Gurvand ( 874–877), ruling Brittany (northern part) with Pasquitan
Judicael ( 877–888), successor of Gurvand, ruled Brittany (north) with Alan the Great (south)
Alan the Great (reigned from 877 to 888 with Judicaël, alone as a duke, then as a king up to 907)
Gourmaëlon, Count of Cornouaille (reigned from 907 as a guardian of the kingdom)

The succession was interrupted by the Viking occupation (907–937)

House of Nantes

|width=auto| Alan IIthe Fox(Alan al Louarn)938–952
| 
|  before 919son of Mathuedoi, Count of Poher, and a daughter of Alan I
| (1) Roscille of Anjou943(2) ? of Bloisbef. 949/51one son
|  952Nantesaged about 33
|-
|width=auto| Drogo(Drogon)952–958
| 
|  949/52only legitimate son of Alan II
| never married
|  958Angersaged 5–9
|-
|width=auto| Hoël I(Hoel Iañ )958–981
| 
| ?illegitimate son of Alan II and the "noble" Judith
| never married
|  981
|-

|width=auto| Guerech(Guerech Iañ)981–988
|
| ?illegitimate son of Alan II and the "noble" Judith, younger brother of Hoël I
| Aremburga of Ancenisafter 981one son
|  988
|-
|width=auto| Alan(Alan Breizh)988–990
|
| after 981son of Guerech and Aremburga of Ancenis
| never married
|  990
|-
|}

House of Rennes

|width=auto| Conan I(Konan Iañ)990–992
| 
|  927eldest son of Judicael Berengar, Count of Rennes and Gerberga
| Ermengarde-Gerberga of Anjou973five children
| 27 June 992Conquereuilaged 64–65
|-
|width=auto| Geoffrey I(Jafrez Iañ )992–1008
| 
|  980eldest son of Conan I and Ermengarde-Gerberga of Anjou
| Hawise of Normandy996four children
| 20 November 1008aged 27–28
|-
|width=auto| Alan III(Alan III)1008–1040with Odo I as regent, then co-ruler (1008–1034)
| 
|  997eldest son of Geoffrey I and Hawise of Normandy
| Bertha of Blois1018two children
| 1 October 1040Montgommeryaged 42–43
|-
|width=auto| Odo I(Eozen I)1008–1034as regent, then co-ruler to Alan III
| 
|  999second son of Geoffrey I and Hawise of Normandy
| Orguen of Cornouaillesix children
|  1079Cessonaged 79–80
|-
|width=auto| Conan II(Konan II)1040–1066with Odo I as regent (1040–1057)
| 
|  1033only son of Alan III and Bertha of Blois
| never married
| 11 December 1066Château-Gontieraged 32–33
|-
|width=auto| Hawise(Hawiz)1066–1072with Hoël II 
| 
|  1037only daughter of Alan III and Bertha of Blois
| rowspan="2"| 1066seven children
| 19 August 1072aged 34–35
|-
|width=auto| Hoël II(Hoël II)1066–1072with Hawise 
| 
|  1031eldest son of Alain Canhiart, Count of Cornouaille and Judith of Nantes, descendant of Alan II
| 13 April 1084aged 52–53
|-
|}

House of Cornouaille

|width=auto| Alan IVthe Younger(Alan IV Fergant )1072–1112with Hoël II as regent(1072–1084)
| 
| bef. 1060eldest son of Hoël II and Hawise
| (1) Constance of Normandy1086/88no issue(2) Ermengarde of Anjou1093three children
| 13 October 1119Redon Abbeyaged 60s
|-
|width=auto| Conan IIIthe Fat(Konan III)1112–1148
| 
|  1093–1096eldest son of Alan IV and Ermengarde of Anjou
| Maud FitzRoy1112three children
| 17 September 1148aged 54–58
|-
|width=auto| Bertha(Berta)1148–1156with Odo II 
| 
|  1114eldest daughter of Conan III and Maud FitzRoy
| (1) Alan, 1st Earl of Richmond1137/8three children(2) Odo II1148three children
|  1156aged 41–43
|-
|width=auto| Odo II(Eozen II)1148–1156with Bertha 
| 
| ?eldest son of Geoffrey, Viscount of Porhoet and Hawise
| (1) Bertha1148three children(2) Joan-Eleanor of LéonAugust 1167two or three children
|  1170
|-
|}

House of Penthièvre

|width=auto| Conan IV the Black(Konan IV)1156–1166
| 
|  1138only son of Alan of Penthièvre, 1st Earl of Richmond and Bertha
| Margaret of Huntingdon1160one daughter 
| 20 February 1171aged 33
|-
|width=auto| Constance(Konstanza)1166–1201with Geoffrey II(1181–1186)with Arthur I(1196–1201)with Guy(1199–1201)
| 
|  1161daughter of Conan IV and Margaret of Huntingdon
| (1) Geoffrey IIJuly 1181three children(2) Ranulf3 February 1188no issue(3) Guy of ThouarsOctober 1199two or three daughters
| 5 September 1201Nantesaged 40
|-
|width=auto| Geoffrey II(Jafrez II)1181–1186with Constance 
|  
| 23 September 1158fourth son of Henry II of England and Eleanor of Aquitaine
| ConstanceJuly 1181three children
| 19 August 1186Paris, Franceaged 27
|-
|width=auto| Guy(Gi)1199–12011203–1213with Constance(1199–1201)with Alix(1203–1213)
| 
| birth date unknownsecond son of Aimery IV of Thouars and Aénor of Lusignan
| (1) ConstanceOctober 1199two or three daughters(2) Eustachie of Chemillé1203two sons
| 13 April 1213Chemillé, France
|-
|}

House of Plantagenet

|width=auto| Arthur I(Arzhur Iañ)1196–1203with Constance(1196–1201)
|
| 29 March 1187in Nantes,only son of Geoffrey II and Constance
| never married
| Disappeared in captivity aged 16; fate unknown 
|-
|}

Eleanor, Fair Maid of Brittany, eldest daughter of Geoffrey and Constance and full elder sister of Arthur, also unmarried, was prevented from succession for her imprisonment in England which lasted till her death in 1241, thus was merely a titular duchess until 1214 when John, King of England ceased to support her claim.

House of Thouars

|width=auto| Alix(Alis)1203–1221with Guy as regent(1203–1213)with Peter I(1213–1221)
| 
| 1200eldest daughter of Guy and Constance
| Peter I1213three children
| 21 October 1221aged 21
|-
|width=auto| Peter IMauclerc(Pêr Iañ)1213–1221with Alix
|  
|  1190second son of Robert II of Dreux and Yolanda de Coucy
| (1) Alix1213three children(2) Nicole 1230one son(3) Marguerite de Commequiersbef. January 1236no issue
| 6 July 1250sea off Damiettaaged 59–60
|-
|}

House of Dreux

|width=auto| John Ithe Red(Yann Iañ ar Ruz)1221–1286with Peter I as regent(1221–1237)
| 
|  1217/18eldest son of Peter I and Alix
| Blanche of NavarreChâteau-Thierry, Aisne16 January 1236eight children
| 8 October 1286Château de l'Isle, Férel, Morbihanaged 67–69
|-
|width=auto| John II(Yann II)1286–1305
| 
| 3/4 January 1239eldest son of John I and Blanche of Navarre
| Beatrice of EnglandWestminster Abbey, London25 December 1260eight children
| 16 November 1305Lyonaged 66
|-
|width=auto| Arthur II(Arzhur II)1305–1312
| 
| 2 July 1262eldest son of John II and Beatrice of England
| (1) Marie of LimogesTours1277three children(2) Yolande of DreuxMay 1292six children
| 27 August 1312Château de l'Isle, Férel, Morbihanaged 50
|-
|width=auto| John IIIthe Good(Yann III)1312–1341
| 
| 8 March 1286Château de Champtoceaux, Maine-et-Loireeldest son of Arthur II and Marie of Limoges
| (1) Isabella of Valois18 February 1298no issue(2) Isabella of Castile and LeónBurgos21 June 1310no issue(3) Joan of SavoyChartres21 March 1330no issue
| 30 April 1341Caenaged 55
|}

Breton War of Succession

|width=auto| Joanthe Lame(Janed)1341–1364with Charles I 
| 
|  1319only daughter of Guy of Brittany, Count of Penthièvre and Joan of Avaugour
| rowspan="2"| Paris4 June 1337five children
| 10 September 1384Guingampaged 64–65
|-
|width=auto| Charles I(Charlez Iañ)1341–1364with Joan 
| 
|  1319Bloissecond son of Guy I, Count of Blois and Margaret of Valois
| 29 September 1364Aurayaged 44–45
|-
|width=auto| John (IV) of Montfort(Yann IV Moñforzh)May 1341–1345
| 
|  1293only son of Arthur II and Yolande de Dreux
| Joanna of FlandersChartresMarch 1329two children
| 26 September 1345Château d'Hennebon, Hennebontaged 51–52
|-
|width=auto| John (V) of Montfort(Yann V Moñforzh)1345–1364
| 
|  1339only son of John of Montfort and Joanna of Flanders
| (1) Mary Plantagenet of EnglandWoodstock Palace, Woodstock, Oxfordshiresummer of 1361no issue(2) Joan HollandLondonMay 1366no issue(3) Joan of NavarreSaillé-près-Guérande2 October 1386nine children
| 1/2 November 1399Nantesaged 59–60
|}

House of Montfort

|width=auto| John IVthe Conqueror(Yann IV)1364–1399(Previously John V in pretentious succession from his father.)
| 
|  1339only son of John of Montfort and Joanna of Flanders
| (1) Mary Plantagenet of EnglandWoodstock Palace, Woodstock, Oxfordshiresummer of 1361no issue(2) Joan HollandLondonMay 1366no issue(3) Joan of NavarreSaillé-près-Guérande2 October 1386nine children
| 1/2 November 1399Nantesaged 59–60
|-
|width=auto| John Vthe Wise(Yann V ar Fur)1399–1442
| 
| 24 December 1389Château de l'Hermine, Vannes, Morbihaneldest son of John IV and Joan of Navarre
| Joan of FranceHôtel de Saint-Pol, Paris19 September 1396seven children
| 29 August 1442Manoir de La Touche, Nantesaged 52
|-
|width=auto| Francis Ithe Well-Loved(Frañsez Iañ)1442–1450
|  
| 11 May 1414Vanneseldest son of John V and Joan of France
| (1) Yolande of AnjouAmboise20 August 1431one son(2) Isabella of ScotlandChâteau d'Auray30 October 1442two daughter
| 17 July 1450Château de l'Hermine, Vannes, Morbihanaged 36
|-
|width=auto| Peter IIthe Simple(Pêr II)1450–1457
|  
| 7 July 1418Nantessecond son of John V and Joan of France
| Françoise d'Amboise 1442no issue
| 22 September 1457Nantesaged 41
|-
|width=auto| Arthur IIIthe Justicier(Arzhur III)1457–1458
|  
| 24 August 1393Château de Suscinio, Vannessecond son of John IV and Joan of Navarre
| (1) Margaret of BurgundyDijon10 October 1423no issue(2) Jeanne d'AlbretNérac29 August 1442no issue(3) Catherine of Saint Pol2 July 1445no issue
| 26 December 1458Nantesaged 65
|-
|width=auto| Francis II(Frañsez II)1458–1488
|  
| 23 June 1433Château de Clissoneldest son of Richard de Dreux, Count of Étampes and Marguerite d'Orléans, Countess of Vertus
| (1) Marguerite of BrittanyChâteau de l'Hermine16 November 1455one son(2) Marguerite of FoixChâteau de Clisson27 June 1474two daughters
| 9 September 1488Couëronaged 55
|-
|width=auto| Anne(Anna)1488–1514
|  
| 25 January 1477Château de Nanteseldest daughter of Francis II and Margaret of Foix
| (1) Maximilian I, Holy Roman Emperor(by proxy) Rennes Cathedral19 December 1490no issue(2) Charles VIII of FranceChâteau de Langeais19 December 1491four children(3) Louis XII of FranceChâteau de Nantes8 January 1499four children
| 9 January 1514Château de Bloisaged 36
|}

House of Valois

|width=auto| Claude(Klaoda)1514–1524withFrancis(1514–1515)
|  
| 14 October 1499Romorantin-Lanthenayeldest daughter of Louis XII of France and Anne
| Francis I of FranceChâteau de Saint-Germain-en-Laye18 May 1514eight children
| 20 July 1524Château de Bloisaged 24
|-
|width=auto| Francis(Frañsez)1514–1515with Claude(1514–1515)
|  
| 12 September 1494Château de Cognaconly son of Charles de Valois, Count of Angoulême and Louise of Savoy
| (1) ClaudeChâteau de Saint-Germain-en-Laye18 May 1514eight children(2) Eleanor of AustriaAbbaye de Veien7 August 1530no issue
| 31 March 1547Château de Rambouilletaged 52
|-
|width=auto| Francis III(Frañsez III)1524–1536
|  
| 28 February 1518Château d'Amboiseeldest son of Francis I of France and Claude
| never married
| 10 August 1536Chateau de Tournonaged 18
|-
|width=auto| Henry(Herri)1536–1547
|  
| 31 March 1519Château de Saint-Germain-en-Layesecond son of Francis I of France and Claude
| Catherine de' MediciMarseille Cathedral28 October 1533ten children
| 10 July 1559Place des Vosgesaged 40
|-
|}

As courtesy title

|width=auto| Louis de France1704–1705
|  
| 25 June 1704Palace of Versailleseldest son of Louis, Duke of Burgundy and Marie-Adélaïde of Savoy
| never married
| 13 April 1705Palace of Versaillesdied before first birthday
|-
|width=auto| Louis de France1707–1712 
|  
| 8 January 1707Palace of Versaillessecond son of Louis, Duke of Burgundy and Marie Adélaïde of Savoy
| never married
| 18 February 1712Palace of Versaillesaged 5
|-
|width=auto| Francis de Bourbon 1973–1984 
|  
| 22 November 1972Madrideldest son of Alfonso, Duke of Anjou and Cádiz and María del Carmen Martínez-Bordiú y Franco
| never married
| 7 February 1984Pamplonaaged 11
|-
|}

Family tree

See also 
 Brittany
 Château des ducs de Bretagne (Castle of the Dukes of Brittany)
 Duchy of Brittany
 List of Breton royal consorts
 Union of Brittany and France

References

External links 
 BRITTANY, Medieval Lands

History of Brittany
 
Brittany